Côme-Séraphin Cherrier (4 April 1848 – 29 November 1912) was a member of the Legislative Assembly of Quebec.

He was first elected to the Legislative Assembly in the 1897 Quebec general election for the Quebec Liberal Party in Laprairie electoral district.  He was re-elected in 1900 and 1904, but was defeated in 1908.

References
 

1848 births
1912 deaths
Quebec Liberal Party MNAs
People from Montérégie